Tijjani Yahaya Kaura is a Nigerian politician who is the current Managing Director of the Oil and Gas Free Zones Authority (OGFZA) for an initial term of three years also the former minister of State for Foreign Affairs Federal Republic of Nigeria and the Secretary to the Zamfara State Government (SSG), he is the incumbent Senator representing Zamfara North at the Nigeria National House of Assembly. He was elected senator in 2015 and reelected in 23 February, during the 2019 Nigerian general elections under the ruling political party All Progressives Congress (APC). He served as the chairman senate committee on federal character and intergovernmental affairs.

References

Zamfara State
Living people
1959 births
Members of the Senate (Nigeria)
21st-century Nigerian politicians